Kord Ahmad may refer to:
 Kord Ahmad-e Olya
 Kord Ahmad-e Sofla